Below is a list of notable footballers who have played for Muangthong United.

List of players

Key to positions

 
Muangthong United
Association football player non-biographical articles